Greg A. Hill is a Canadian-born First Nations artist and curator. He is Kanyen'kehà:ka Mohawk, from Six Nations of the Grand River Territory, Ontario.

Early life 
Hill was born and raised in Fort Erie, Ontario.

Art career 
His work as a multidisciplinary artist focuses primarily on installation, performance and digital imaging and explores issues of his Mohawk and French-Canadian identity through the prism of colonialism, nationalism and concepts of place and community.

Hill has been exhibiting his work since 1989, with solo exhibitions and performance works across Canada as well as group exhibitions in North America and abroad. His work can be found in the collections of the Canada Council, the Indian Art Centre, Indian and Northern Affairs Canada, the Canadian Native Arts Foundation (now Indspire), the Woodland Cultural Center, the City of Ottawa, the Ottawa Art Gallery and the International Museum of Electrography.

Curatorial career 
Hill serves as the Audain Senior Curator of Indigenous Art at the National Gallery of Canada.

Awards and honours 
In 2018, Hill received the Indspire Award for Arts.

References

External links 
 Official website

Canadian installation artists
Canadian performance artists
First Nations installation artists
First Nations performance artists
Canadian Mohawk people
Year of birth missing (living people)
Living people
Six Nations of the Grand River
Franco-Ontarian people